Frederick Archibald Gresham Leveson Gower (20 February 1871 — 3 October 1946) was an English first-class cricketer and clergyman. He was a member of the Leveson-Gower family. He played first-class cricket for several teams between 1894 and 1909, while as a clergyman he held a number of ecclesiastical posts across the South of England.

Life and first-class cricket
The fifth son of Granville William Gresham Leveson-Gower, he was born in February 1871 at Titsey Place in Surrey. He was educated at Winchester College, before matriculating to Magdalen College, Oxford. While studying at Oxford, Leveson Gower made his debut in first-class cricket for Oxford University Cricket Club against Lancashire at Oxford in 1891. He appeared infrequently for Oxford, making a further four first-class appearances for the university, all in 1894. He failed to gain a cricket Blue at Oxford. He also played in the Gentlemen of the South v the Players of the South fixture of 1894 at Lord's. In 1895 and 1896, he played for the Marylebone Cricket Club (MCC), making three first-class appearances; two against Oxford University and one against Essex. Leveson Gower played two first-class matches for Hampshire, the first of which came against Sussex in the 1899 County Championship, with the second coming against Lancashire in the 1900 County Championship. He had been associated with Hampshire since 1891, when the county was still a second-class county and been described by Wisden as playing for Hampshire "without getting many runs, but was a useful wicket-keeper". After playing for the MCC against Yorkshire at the 1901 Scarborough Festival, Leveson Gower later appeared in two first-class matches for his brother's personal team against Cambridge and Oxford University's at The Saffrons in 1909. In sixteen first-class matches, he scored 424 runs at an average of 15.70; he made two half centuries with a highest score 86, which came for the MCC against Oxford University in 1896.

From Oxford, Leveson-Gower attended the Wells Theological College. He was ordained as a deacon in 1896, and in the same year he was appointed curate at Portsea, an appointment which lasted until 1901. He was then appointed vicar at Linton in Kent in 1901. Having been vicar at Linton for twelve years, he was appointed reverend at Singleton in Sussex in July 1913. During the First World War, he was made a temporary Chaplain, 4th Class, with the Royal Army Chaplains' Department. Leveson Gower died at Folkestone in October 1946. His younger brother, H. D. G. Leveson Gower, was a Test cricketer, while his uncle, Edward Chandos Leigh, also played first-class cricket.

References

External links

1871 births
1946 deaths
People from Tandridge (district)
Sportspeople from Surrey
People educated at Winchester College
Alumni of Magdalen College, Oxford
Alumni of Wells Theological College
English cricketers
Wicket-keepers
Oxford University cricketers
Gentlemen of the South cricketers
Gentlemen of England cricketers
Marylebone Cricket Club cricketers
19th-century English Anglican priests
Hampshire cricketers
H. D. G. Leveson Gower's XI cricketers
20th-century English Anglican priests
English military chaplains
Royal Army Chaplains' Department officers
Frederick Archibald Gresham Leveson-Gower